The Ghana Medical Association (GMA) represents physicians, surgeons and dentists working throughout Ghana. It was established in 1958 and is divided into ten divisions representing each region of Ghana as at the end of 2018.

History
The earliest medical organisation of medical staff was during the Gold Coast era when the Gold Coast Medical Practitioners Union was formed in 1933. This was founded by three doctors, Frederick Victor Nanka-Bruce who was the president and spokesman, C.E. Reindorf and W.A.C. Nanka-Bruce. J.E. Hutton Mills was the secretary. Following the establishment of an African government under colonial rule in 1951, a Ghana branch of the British Medical Association was formed in January 1953. This also had Nanka-Bruce as its first president. Both associations were merged to form the Ghana Medical Association on 4 January 1958. It was inaugurated by Kwame Nkrumah at the Arden Hall of the Ambassador Hotel in Accra. Charles Easmon was elected as the first president of the GMA.

Affiliations
 Confederation of African Medical Associations and Societies
 Commonwealth Medical Association
 World Medical Association

National Executive Council
This council meets every other month. It is made up of the following persons:

 Chairpersons of each of the divisions (numbering ten at end of 2018)
 Society of Private Medical and Dental Practitioners
 Ghana Dental Association
 Junior Doctors Society

Publications
 Ghana Medical Journal

Past presidents of the GMA
The president of the GMA since 2017 has been Frank Ankobea. There have been 22 past presidents as at 2018.

 Charles Easmon (1958–1962)
 J. A. Schandorf (1962–1963)
 M. A. Barnor (1963–1966)
 Silas R .A. Dodu (1966–1968)
 Emmanuel Evans-Anfom (1968–1970)
 H. S. Bannerman (1970–1974)
 J. T. Glover (1974–1978)
 Cornelius Odarquaye Quarcoopome (1978–1980)
 K. Dsane-Selby (1980–1983)
 J. O. M. Pobee (1983–1986)
 Harold H. Phillips (1986–1990)
 Jonathan H. Addy (1990–1992)
 Kwame Addo-Kufuor (1992–1995)
 Sir. G. W. Brobby (1995-1997)
 J. K. Kwakye-Maafo (1997–1999)
 Agyeman Badu Akosa (1999–2001)
 Jacob Plange-Rhule (2001–2003)
 Yaw Adu-Gyamfi (2003–2005)
 Francis Adu-Ababio (2005–2007)
 E. A. Adom Winful (2007–2011)
 Kwabena Opoku-Adusei (2011–2015)
 Ebenezer Ewusi-Emmim (2015–2017)

See also
Ghana Medical and Dental Council

References

External links
 Official website

1958 establishments in Ghana
Organizations established in 1958
Professional associations based in Ghana